Charles Henry Prisk (December 24, 1875 – 1940) was a California newspaper executive. He was editor and owner of the Pasadena Star-News; and he owned the Pasadena Post, and the Long Beach Press-Telegram, of which his brother,  William F. Prisk, was the publisher. Prisk was also the publisher of the Grass Valley Union in Nevada County, California.

Personal life
Prisk was born in Grass Valley, California, the son of William Frederick Prisk, Sr. and Mary (Hosking) Prisk. His parents were from Camborne, Cornwall, England, and they settled in Grass Valley where his father worked as a miner. Prisk began working in the newspaper business at age 12; he graduated from Stanford University.  A portrait of Prisk by Stephen Seymour Thomas is part of the Pasadena Historical Society collection. His daughter, Neva Prisk Malaby, married the Olympian, Charles William Paddock who joined Prisk in the newspaper business, Paddock eventually becoming vice president and general manager of the Pasadena Star-News, the Pasadena Post, and the Long Beach Press-Telegram. Prisk served as President of Pasadena's Rotary Club, and on the Board of Directors of First Trust and Savings Bank of Pasadena.

References

1875 births
1940 deaths
People from Grass Valley, California
People from Pasadena, California
Editors of California newspapers
American newspaper publishers (people)
American people of English descent
Journalists from California